The following are prominent people who were born, raised, have lived for a significant period in Iwate Prefecture or have otherwise had a significant impact.

Native Emishi and opponents
Aterui (? - 802) Isawa Emishi leader who was executed in 802.
Sakanoue no Tamuramaro (758-811) Governor of Michinoku and Seii Tai Shōgun.

Abe family and opponents
Abe no Yoritoki (died 1057) chief of the six semi-autonomous Ezo districts and Martial of Frontier Defense.
Abe no Sadato (1019-1062) chief of the six semi-autonomous Ezo districts.
Minamoto no Yoriyoshi  (988-1075) Governor of Mutsu.
Minamoto no Yoshiie  (1041-1108) son of Yoriyoshi, called Hachiman Taro.

Fujiwara family and opponents
Fujiwara no Kiyohira (1056-1128) Founder of the Oshu Fujiwara dynasty and builder of Chūson-ji.
Fujiwara no Tsunekiyo (?-1062) Father of Fujiwara no Kiyohira.
Fujiwara no Hidehira (1122?-1187) Third head of the Oshu Fujiwaras and governor of Mutsu.
Minamoto no Yoshitsune (1159-1189) General of the Minamoto clan.
Minamoto no Yoritomo (1147-1199) First Shōgun.

Buddhist leaders
Gyoki Founder of Shoboji in Oshu City.
Jakucho Setouchi (1922- ) Head priest at Tendai-ji, author and speaker.

Captains of science and industry
Takano Chōei (1804–50) Dutch scholar, physician, writer, translator and dissident.
Takatō Ōshima (1826-1901) made the first Western-style blast furnace in Japan and cannons.

Military leaders
Ichinohe Hyoe (1855-1931) Army General.
Seishirō Itagaki (1885-1948) Army General and Class A War criminal.
Shigeru Iwasaki (1953–Present) Chief of Staff of the Joint Staff Council, Japan Self-Defense Forces

Political leaders
Hara Takashi(1856-1921) Prime Minister.
Gotō Shinpei (1857-1929) Mayor of Tokyo, Founder of Boy Scouts in Japan, Home Minister and Foreign Minister.
Saitō Makoto (1858-1936) Admiral, Governor of Korea and Prime Minister.
Nitobe Inazō (1862-1933) diplomat, author of Bushido: The Soul of Japan and Christian.
Mitsumasa Yonai (1880-1948) Minister of Navy and Prime Minister.
Zenko Suzuki (1911-2004) Prime Minister.
Ichirō Ozawa (1942-) leader of Democratic Party of Japan.

Writers
Kunio Yanagita (1875-1962) scholar and author of Tōno Monogatari.
Takuboku Ishikawa (1886-1912) publisher and poet.
Kenji Miyazawa (1896-1932) teacher, poet and writer of fairy tales.
Harumi Setouchi (1921- ) winner of Tanizaki Prize and Noma Prize.
Kanichi Fujiwara (1961-) long distance motorcyclist, photographer, author and blogger

 
Iwate